The following is a list of prominent people born / settled in areas coming under the present day Thrissur District, Kerala.

Science and academia
Pulickel Ajayan
George Menachery
Mani Menon
K. N. Panikkar
K. Radhakrishnan
Sankaranarayana
P. N. Vinayachandran

Economy and business
M. A. Yousuf Ali
Joy Alukkas
Kochouseph Chittilappilly
John Matthai
K. P. Karunakara Menon
PNC Menon (Originally from Palakkad district, later migrated to Thrissur with his parents)
K. N. Raj
P. Mohamed Ali
T. S. Kalyanaraman
M. P. Ramachandran

Spiritual leaders
Swami Bhoomananda Tirtha
Mar George Alapatt
Mar Raphael Cheenath
Pulikkottil Joseph Mar Dionysious I (Mar Thoma X)
Pulikkottil Joseph Mar Dionysious II
Euphrasia Eluvathingal
Canisius Thekkekara
Alex Kaliyanil
Mar Aprem Mooken
Cyril Mar Baselios I
Swami Ranganathananda
Antony Thachuparambil
Mar Jacob Thoomkuzhy
Mar Andrews Thazhath
Mar Raphael Thattil
Paulose II, Catholicos of the East 
 Mariam Thresia Chiramel

Literature
Balamani Amma
Sukumar Azhikode
P. Bhaskaran
Sarah Joseph
Kovilan
K. Kunchunniraja
Lalitha Lenin
Madampu Kunjukuttan
Kunjunni Mash
George Menachery
M. K. Ramachandran
K. Satchidanandan
C. V. Sreeraman
Kamala Surayya
Kodungallur Kunjikkuttan Thampuran
Attoor Ravi Varma
R Ramachandran
V. K. N.
M. N. Vijayan
M. Leelavathy
Attoor Krishna Pisharody
N. V. Krishna Warrier
Madhavan Ayyappath
V. K. Sreeraman
Vijayarajamallika

Politics

 R. Bindu
 P. R. Francis
 P. P. George
 K. Karunakaran (Originally from Kannur district, migrated to Thrissur for treating his visual disorder) 
 C. Achutha Menon
 C. N. Jayadevan
 Panampilly Govinda Menon
 Joseph Mundassery
 K. P. Prabhakaran
 K. P. Rajendran
 Therambil Ramakrishnan
 Rajaji Mathew Thomas
 V. M. Sudheeran
 M.P Vincent
 E. Ikkanda Warrier
 V. V. Raghavan
 K. Muraleedharan
 K. Radhakrishnan (politician)
 Anil Akkara
A. C. Moideen

Performing artists
Ammannur Madhava Chakyar
Kalamandalam Gopi
Kalamandalam Hyderali
Kalamandalam Appukutty Poduval

Singers
Bombay Sisters
Gayatri Asokan
P Jayachandran
KK
Asha G Menon
Unni Menon
Jyotsna Radhakrishnan
Pradip Somasundaran
Vaishnav Girish

Malayalam film industry
Omar Lulu
KJ Joy
Sathish Kalathil
Premji 
Sathyan Anthikkad
Ramu Kariat
Mala Aravindan
Bombay Sisters
Edavela Babu
Bahadoor
Bharathan
P. Bhaskaran
Biju Menon
Sudha Chandran
Devan
Gopika
Innocent
Johnson
Santhosh Jogi
Alphons Joseph
Mejo Joseph
pramod Pappan
Rima Kallingal
Kamal
Yusuf Ali Kechery
Lena
A. K. Lohithadas
Mallika
Kalabhavan Mani
P. N. Menon
Renuka Menon
Sindhu Menon
Unni Mukundan
Narain
Ouseppachan
Pavithran
Philomina
T. G. Ravi
Shankar
Sheela
Mohan Sithara
Sreenath
Oduvil Unnikrishnan
Samyuktha Varma
K. R. Vijaya
Geetha Vijayan
Vani Viswanath
Manju Warrier
CI Paul
Akku Akbar
Priyanandanan
Rafeeq Ahammed
Lal Jose
V. K. Sreeraman
Tovino Thomas
Anupama Parameswaran
Jyothi Krishna
Rachana Narayanankutty
Gayathri Suresh
Aparna Balamurali
Malavika Menon
Malavika Wales
Irshad
Lijo Jose Pellissery
Joju George
Shivaji Guruvayoor

Sports
Jo Paul Ancheri
C. V. Pappachan
I. M. Vijayan
Rino Anto
Shreyas Iyer
Sandeep Warrier
Rahul Kannoly Praveen
Nihal Sarin

Lists of people by city in India
 
People from Thrissur, List of
Lists of people from Kerala